Emma McDougall (born Emma Burnley; 6 March 1991 – 20 February 2013) was an English female football winger who played for Blackburn Rovers Ladies. Her married name was Emma Mincher, but she used her maiden name in her playing career. She was born in Manchester.

Club career
McDougall joined Blackburn from Fletcher Moss Rangers in January 2008, and made her first-team debut in a 17–0 Lancashire Cup win the following month. She appeared as a substitute in three of Rovers' final Premier League games that season and, after a formal promotion to the senior side, played more regularly in the 2008–09 season.

Her first Blackburn goals came in September 2008, scoring twice as Rovers beat Rotherham United Ladies 7–2 in the first round of the Women's Premier League Cup.

Later years
McDougall stopped playing for Blackburn Rovers after becoming pregnant and following the birth of her first child. She was later rediagnosed with cancer for the second time and died on 20 February 2013 at age 21. McDougall is survived by her husband, and two daughters, Lilly-Mae and Molly-Rae Mincher.

Statistics

References

English women's footballers
Fletcher Moss Rangers F.C. players
Blackburn Rovers L.F.C. players
FA Women's National League players
1991 births
2013 deaths
Deaths from cancer in England
Place of death missing
Footballers from Manchester
Women's association football midfielders